Dylann Duncan Ceriani is an American former volleyball player, who played for the United States women's national volleyball team, and as a professional volleyball player in both the United States and Switzerland.

Playing career
She has also received the NCAA Silver Anniversary Award in recognition of her college volleyball career, leading Brigham Young University to four successive NCAA tournament appearances, and was twice selected as an All-American player (in 1987 and 1988), and three times as a CoSIDA Academic All-American.  She holds a degree in electrical and computer engineering.  She is a member of BYU's athletic hall of fame, and has been described as BYU's most decorated female athlete.

References

American women's volleyball players
BYU Cougars women's volleyball players
Living people
Sportspeople from Salt Lake City
Volleyball players from San Diego
University of California, Berkeley alumni
Year of birth missing (living people)
Middle blockers
Expatriate volleyball players in Switzerland
American expatriate sportspeople in Switzerland